Erotic literature comprises fictional and factual stories and accounts of eros (passionate, romantic or sexual relationships) intended to arouse similar feelings in readers. This contrasts erotica, which focuses more specifically on sexual feelings. Other common elements are satire and social criticism. Much erotic literature features erotic art, illustrating the text.

Although cultural disapproval of erotic literature has always existed, its circulation was not seen as a major problem before the invention of printing, as the costs of producing individual manuscripts limited distribution to a very small group of wealthy and literate readers. The invention of printing, in the 15th century, brought with it both a greater market and increasing restrictions, including censorship and legal restraints on publication on the grounds of obscenity. Because of this, much of the production of this type of material became clandestine.

Erotic verse

Early periods
The oldest located love poem is Istanbul 2461, an erotic monologue written by a female speaker directed to king Shu-Sin.

In ancient Sumer, a whole cycle of poems revolved around the erotic lovemaking between the goddess Inanna and her consort Dumuzid the Shepherd.

In the Hebrew Bible, the Song of Songs, found in the last section of the Tanakh, celebrates sexual love, giving "the voices of two lovers, praising each other, yearning for each other, proffering invitations to enjoy".

Many erotic poems have survived from ancient Greece and Rome. The Greek poets Straton of Sardis and Sappho of Lesbos both wrote erotic lyric poems. The poet Archilochus wrote numerous satirical poems filled with obscene and erotic imagery. Erotic poems continued to be written in Hellenistic and Roman times by writers like Automedon (The Professional and Demetrius the Fortunate), Philodemus (Charito) and Marcus Argentarius. Notable Roman erotic poets included Catullus, Propertius, Tibullus, Ovid, Martial and Juvenal, and the anonymous Priapeia. Some later Latin authors such as Joannes Secundus also wrote erotic verse.

Haft Peykar also known as Bahramnameh (The Book of Bahram) is a romantic epic by the Persian poet Nizami Ganjavi written in 1197. This poem is a part of the Nizami's Khamsa. The original title Haft Peykar can be translated literally as “seven portraits” with the figurative meaning of “seven beauties.” The poem is a masterpiece of erotic literature, but it is also a profoundly moralistic work.

During the Renaissance period, many poems were not written for publication; instead, they were merely circulated in manuscript form among a relatively limited readership. This was the original method of circulation for the Sonnets of William Shakespeare, who also wrote the erotic poems Venus and Adonis and The Rape of Lucrece.

The Perfumed Garden of Sensual Delight (Arabic: الروض العاطر في نزهة الخاطر) is a fifteenth-century Arabic Islamic sex manual and work of erotic literature by Muhammad ibn Muhammad al-Nefzawi, also known simply as "Nefzawi". The book presents opinions on what qualities men and women should have to be attractive and gives advice on sexual technique, warnings about sexual health, and recipes to remedy sexual maladies. It gives lists of names for the penis and vulva, and has a section on the interpretation of dreams. Interspersed with these there are a number of stories which are intended to give context and amusement.

17th and 18th centuries

In the 17th century, John Wilmot, Earl of Rochester (1647–80) was notorious for obscene verses, many of which were published posthumously in compendiums of poetry by him and other "Restoration rakes" such as Sir Charles Sedley, Charles Sackville, 6th Earl of Dorset, and George Etherege. Though many of the poems attributed to Rochester were actually by other authors, his reputation as a libertine was such that his name was used as a selling point by publishers of collections of erotic verse for centuries after. One poem definitely by him was "A Ramble in St. James's Park", in which the protagonist's quest for healthy exercise in the park uncovers instead "Bugg'ries, Rapes and Incest" on ground polluted by debauchery from the time when "Ancient Pict began to Whore". This poem was being censored from collections of Rochester's poetry as late as 1953, though, in line with the subsequent general change in attitudes to sexuality, it was dramatised as a scene in the film The Libertine about his life, based on an existing play.

English collections of erotic verse by various hands include the Drollery collections of the 17th century; Pills to Purge Melancholy (1698–1720); the Roxburghe Ballads; Bishop Percy's Folio; The Musical Miscellany; National Ballad and Song: Merry Songs and Ballads Prior to the Year AD 1800 (1895–97) edited by J. S. Farmer; the three volume Poetica Erotica (1921) and its more obscene supplement the Immortalia (1927) both edited by T. R. Smith. French collections include Les Muses gaillardes (1606) Le Cabinet satyrique (1618) and La Parnasse des poetes satyriques (1622).

A famous collection of four erotic poems, was published in England in 1763, called An Essay on Woman. This included the title piece, an obscene parody of Alexander Pope's "An Essay on Man"; "Veni Creator: or, The Maid's Prayer", which is original; the "Universal Prayer", an obscene parody of Pope's poem of the same name, and "The Dying Lover to his Prick", which parodies "A Dying Christian to his Soul" by Pope. These poems have been attributed to John Wilkes and/or Thomas Potter and receive the distinction of being the only works of erotic literature ever read out loud and in their entirety in the House of Lords—before being declared obscene and blasphemous by that body and the supposed author, Wilkes, declared an outlaw.

Robert Burns worked to collect and preserve Scottish folk songs, sometimes revising, expanding, and adapting them. One of the better known of these collections is The Merry Muses of Caledonia (the title is not by Burns), a collection of bawdy lyrics that were popular in the music halls of Scotland as late as the 20th century.

19th century

One of the 19th century's foremost poets—Algernon Charles Swinburne—devoted much of his considerable talent to erotic verse, producing, inter alia, twelve eclogues on flagellation titled The Flogging Block "by Rufus Rodworthy, annotated by Barebum Birchingly"; more was published anonymously in The Whippingham Papers (c. 1888). Another notorious anonymous 19th-century poem on the same subject is The Rodiad, ascribed (seemingly falsely and in jest) to George Colman the Younger. John Camden Hotten even wrote a pornographic comic opera, Lady Bumtickler’s Revels, on the theme of flagellation in 1872.

Pierre Louÿs helped found a literary review, La Conque in 1891, where he proceeded to publish Astarte—an early collection of erotic verse already marked by his distinctive elegance and refinement of style. He followed up in 1894 with another erotic collection in 143 prose poems—Songs of Bilitis (Les Chansons de Bilitis), this time with strong lesbian themes.

20th century
Although D. H. Lawrence could be regarded as a writer of love poems, he usually dealt in the less romantic aspects of love such as sexual frustration or the sex act itself. Ezra Pound, in his Literary Essays, complained of Lawrence's interest in his own "disagreeable sensations" but praised him for his "low-life narrative". This is a reference to Lawrence's dialect poems akin to the Scots poems of Robert Burns, in which he reproduced the language and concerns of the people of Nottinghamshire from his youth. He called one collection of poems Pansies partly for the simple ephemeral nature of the verse but also a pun on the French word panser, to dress or bandage a wound. "The Noble Englishman" and "Don't Look at Me" were removed from the official edition of Pansies on the grounds of obscenity; Lawrence felt wounded by this.

From the age of 17, Gavin Ewart acquired a reputation for wit and accomplishment through such works as "Phallus in Wonderland" and "Poems and Songs", which appeared in 1939 and was his first collection. The intelligence and casually flamboyant virtuosity with which he framed his often humorous commentaries on human behaviour made his work invariably entertaining and interesting. The irreverent eroticism for which his poetry is noted resulted in W H Smith's banning of his "The Pleasures of the Flesh" (1966) from their shops.

Canadian poet John Glassco wrote Squire Hardman (1967), a long poem in heroic couplets, purporting to be a reprint of an 18th-century poem by George Colman the Younger, on the theme of flagellation.

Italian Una Chi distinguished herself among other publications for coldly analytical prose and for the crudeness of the stories.

Erotic fiction
Erotic fiction is fiction that portrays sex or sexual themes, generally in a more literary or serious way than the fiction seen in pornographic magazines. It sometimes includes elements of satire or social criticism. Such works have frequently been banned by the government or religious authorities. Non-fictional works that portray sex or sexual themes may contain fictional elements. Calling an erotic book 'a memoir' is a literary device that is common in this genre. For reasons similar to those that make pseudonyms both commonplace and often deviously set up, the boundary between fiction and non-fiction is broad. 

Erotic fiction has been credited in large part for the sexual awakening and liberation of women in the 20th and 21st centuries.

History of western erotic fiction

Ancient, medieval, and early modern periods

The Satyricon of Petronius Arbiter (later made into a film by Fellini) is an ancient Roman novel, which has partially survived, narrating the misadventures of an impotent man named Encolpius, who has been cursed by the god Priapus. The novel is filled with bawdy and obscene episodes, including orgies, ritual sex, and other erotic incidents. The discovery of several fragments of Lollianos's Phoenician Tale reveal that a genre of picaresque erotic novel also existed in ancient Greece. Some of the ancient Greek romance novels, such as Daphnis and Chloe, also contain elements of sexual fantasy.

From the medieval period, there is the Decameron (1353) by the Italian Giovanni Boccaccio (made into a film by Pasolini) which features tales of lechery by monks and the seduction of nuns from convents. This book was banned in many countries. Even five centuries after publication copies were seized and destroyed by the authorities in the US and the UK. For instance between 1954 and 1958 eight orders for destruction of the book were made by English magistrates.

From the 15th century, another classic of Italian erotica is a series of bawdy folk tales called the Facetiae by Gian Francesco Poggio Bracciolini. The Tale of Two Lovers written in 1444 was one of the bestselling books of the 15th century, even before its author, Aeneas Sylvius Piccolomini, became Pope Pius II. It is one of the earliest examples of an epistolary novel, full of erotic imagery. The first printed edition was published by Ulrich Zel in Cologne between 1467 and 1470.

The 16th century was notable for the Heptameron of Marguerite de Navarre (1558), inspired by Boccaccio's Decameron and the notorious I Modi which married erotic drawings, depicting postures assumed in sexual intercourse, by Giulio Romano, with obscene sonnets by Pietro Aretino.

Aretino also wrote the celebrated whore dialogue Ragionamenti, in which the sex lives of wives, whores and nuns are compared and contrasted.  Later works in the same genre include La Retorica delle Puttane (The Whore's Rhetoric) (1642) by Ferrante Pallavicino; L'Ecole des Filles (The school for girls) (1655), attributed to Michel Millot and Jean L'Ange. and The Dialogues of Luisa Sigea (c. 1660) by Nicolas Chorier.  Such works typically concerned the sexual education of a naive younger woman by an experienced older woman and often included elements of philosophising, satire and anti-clericalism. Donald Thomas has translated L'École des filles, as The School of Venus, (1972), described on its back cover as "both an uninhibited manual of sexual technique and an erotic masterpiece of the first order". In his diary Samuel Pepys records reading and (in an often censored passage) masturbating over this work. Chorier's Dialogues of Luisa Sigea goes a bit further than its predecessors in this genre and has the older female giving practical instruction of a lesbian nature to the younger woman plus recommending the spiritual and erotic benefits of a flogging from willing members of the holy orders. This work was translated into many languages under various different titles, appearing in English as A Dialogue between a Married Woman and a Maid in various editions. The School of Women first appeared as a work in Latin entitled Aloisiae Sigaeae, Toletanae, Satyra sotadica de arcanis Amoris et Veneris. This manuscript claimed that it was originally written in Spanish by Luisa Sigea de Velasco, an erudite poet and maid of honor at the court of Lisbon and was then translated into Latin by Jean or Johannes Meursius. The attribution to Sigea and Meursius was a lie; the true author was Nicolas Chorier.

A unique work of this time is Sodom, or the Quintessence of Debauchery (1684), a closet play by the notorious Restoration rake, John Wilmot, 2nd Earl of Rochester in which Bolloxinion, King of Sodom, authorises "that buggery may be used O'er all the land, so cunt be not abused", which order, though appealing to soldiery, has deleterious effects generally, leading the court physician to counsel: "Fuck women, and let Bugg'ry be no more".

18th century

An early pioneer of the publication of erotic works in England was Edmund Curll (1675–1747), who published many of the Merryland books. These were an English genre of erotic fiction in which the female body (and sometimes the male) was described in terms of a landscape. The earliest work in this genre seems to be Erotopolis: The Present State of Bettyland (1684) probably by Charles Cotton. This was included, in abbreviated form, in The Potent Ally: or Succours from Merryland (1741). Other works include  A New Description of Merryland. Containing a Topographical, Geographical and Natural History of that Country (1740) by Thomas Stretzer, Merryland Displayed (1741) and set of maps entitled A Compleat Set of Charts of the Coasts of Merryland (1745). The last book in this genre appears to be a parody of Laurence Sterne's A Sentimental Journey Through France and Italy (1768) entitled La Souriciere. The Mousetrap. A Facetious and Sentimental Excursion through part of Austrian Flanders and France (1794) by "Timothy Touchit".

The rise of the novel in 18th-century England provided a new medium for erotica. One of the most famous in this genre was Fanny Hill (1748) by John Cleland. This book set a standard in literary smut and was often adapted for the cinema in the 20th century. Peter Fryer suggests that Fanny Hill was a high point in British erotica, at least in the eighteenth century, in a way that mainstream literature around it had also reached a peak at that time, with writers like Defoe, Richardson and Fielding all having made important and lasting contributions to literature in its first half. After 1750, he suggests, when the Romantic period began, the quality of mainstream writing and of smut declined in tandem. Writes Fryer: "sex was driven out of the English novel in the latter half of the eighteenth century. The castration of imaginative English literature made the clandestine literature of sex the most poverty stricken and boring in Europe".

French writers kept their stride. One genre, which vies in oddness with the English "Merryland" productions, was inspired by the newly translated Arabian Nights and involved the transformation of people into objects which were in propinquity with or employed in sexual relationships: such as sofas, dildos and even bidets. The climax of this trend is represented in French philosopher Diderot's Les Bijoux indiscrets (1747) in which a magic ring is employed to get women's vaginas to give an account of their intimate sexual histories.

Other works of French erotica from this period include Thérèse Philosophe (1748) by Jean-Baptiste de Boyer, Marquis d'Argens which describes a girl's initiation into the secrets of both philosophy and sex; The Lifted Curtain or Laura's Education, about a young girl's sexual initiation by her father, written by the French revolutionary politician Comte de Mirabeau; and Les Liaisons dangereuses (Dangerous Liaisons) by Pierre Choderlos de Laclos, first published in 1782.

In the late 18th century, such works as Justine, or the Misfortunes of Virtue and 120 Days of Sodom by the Marquis de Sade were exemplars of the theme of sado-masochism and influenced later erotic accounts of sadism and masochism in fiction. De Sade (as did the later writer Sacher-Masoch) lent his name to the sexual acts which he describes in his work.

19th century
In the Victorian period, the quality of erotic fiction was much below that of the previous century—it was largely written by 'hacks'. Some works, however, borrowed from established literary models, such as Dickens. The period also featured a form of social stratification. Even in the throes of orgasm, the social distinctions between master and servant (including form of address) were scrupulously observed. Significant elements of sado-masochism were present in some examples, perhaps reflecting the influence of the English public school, where flagellation was routinely used as a punishment. These clandestine works were often anonymous or written under a pseudonym, and sometimes undated, thus definite information about them often proves elusive.

English erotic novels from this period include The Lustful Turk (1828); The Romance of Lust (1873); The Convent School, or Early Experiences of A Young Flagellant (1876) by Rosa Coote [pseud.]; The Mysteries of Verbena House, or, Miss Bellasis Birched for Thieving (1882) by Etonensis [pseud.], actually by George Augustus Sala and James Campbell Reddie; The Autobiography of a Flea (1887); Venus in India (1889) by 'Captain Charles Devereaux'; Flossie, a Venus of Fifteen: By one who knew this Charming Goddess and worshipped at her shrine (1897). A novel called Beatrice, once marketed as another classic of Victorian erotica from the pen of the ubiquitous "Anon", now appears to be a very clever 20th-century pastiche of Victorian pornography. It first appeared in 1982 and was written by one Gordon Grimley, a sometime managing director of Penthouse International.

Clandestine erotic periodicals of this age include The Pearl, The Oyster and The Boudoir, collections of erotic tales, rhymes, songs and parodies published in London between 1879 and 1883.

The centre of the trade in such material in England at this period was Holywell Street, off the Strand, London. An important publisher of erotic material in the early 19th century was George Cannon (1789–1854), followed in mid-century by William Dugdale (1800–1868) and John Camden Hotten (1832–1873).

An evaluation of 19th-century (pre-1885) and earlier underground erotica, from the author's own private archive, is provided by Victorian writer Henry Spencer Ashbee, using the pseudonym "Pisanus Fraxi", in his bibliographical trilogy Index Librorum Prohibitorum (1877), Centuria Librorum Absconditorum (1879) and Catena Librorum Tacendorum (1885). His plot summaries of the works he discusses in these privately printed volumes are themselves a contribution to the genre. Originally of very limited circulation, changing attitudes have led to his work now being widely available.

Notable European works of erotica at this time were Gamiani, or Two Nights of Excess (1833) by Frenchman Alfred de Musset and Venus in Furs (1870) by the Austrian author Leopold von Sacher-Masoch. The latter erotic novella brought the attention of the world to the phenomenon of masochism, named after the author.

Towards the end of the 19th century, a more "cultured" form of erotica began to appear by poets such as Algernon Charles Swinburne, who pursued themes of paganism, lesbianism and sado-masochism in such works as Lesbia Brandon and in contributions to The Whippingham Papers (1888) edited by St George Stock, author of The Romance of Chastisement (1866). This was associated with the Decadent movement, in particular, with Aubrey Beardsley and the Yellow Book. But it was also to be found in France, amongst such writers as Pierre Louys, author of Les chansons de Bilitis (1894) (a celebration of lesbianism and sexual awakening).

Pioneering works of gay male erotica from this time were The Sins of the Cities of the Plain (1881), which features the celebrated Victorian transvestite duo of Boulton and Park as characters, and Teleny, or The Reverse of the Medal (1893).

Two important publishers of erotic fiction at the end of the 19th century and the beginning of the 20th were Leonard Smithers (1861–1907) and Charles Carrington (1867–1921), both of whom were subject to legal injunctions from the British authorities in order to prohibit their trade in such material. Because of this legal harassment the latter conducted his business from Paris. Erotic fiction published by Carrington at this period includes Raped on the Railway: a True Story of a Lady who was first ravished and then flagellated on the Scotch Express (1894) and The Memoirs of Dolly Morton (1899) set on a slave-plantation in the Southern States of America.

20th century
20th-century erotic fiction includes such classics of the genre as: Suburban Souls (1901), published by Carrington and possibly written by him also; The Confessions of Nemesis Hunt (issued in three volumes 1902, 1903, 1906), probably by George Reginald Bacchus, printed by Duringe of Paris for Leonard Smithers in London; Josephine Mutzenbacher (1906) by Anon. (presumably Felix Salten); Sadopaideia (1907) by Anon. (possibly Algernon Charles Swinburne); Les Mémoires d'un jeune Don Juan (1907) and the somewhat disturbing Les onze mille verges (1907) by Guillaume Apollinaire; The Way of a Man with a Maid (1908) and A Weekend Visit by Anon.; Pleasure Bound Afloat (1908), Pleasure Bound Ashore (1909) and Maudie (1909) by Anon. (probably George Reginald Bacchus), and My Lustful Adventures (1911) by the pseudonymous 'Ramrod'; Manuel de civilité pour les petites filles à l'usage des maisons d'éducation (1917) and Trois filles de leur mère (1926) by Pierre Louys; Story of the Eye (1928) by Georges Bataille; Tropic of Cancer (1934) and Tropic of Capricorn (1938) by Henry Miller; The Story of O (1954) by Pauline Réage; Helen and Desire (1954) and Thongs (1955) by Alexander Trocchi; Ada, or Ardor (1969) by Vladimir Nabokov; Journal (1966), Delta of Venus (1978) and Little Birds (1979) by Anaïs Nin and The Bicycle Rider (1985) by Guy Davenport and Lila Says (1999) by an anonymous author.

Vladimir Nabokov's Lolita is usually described as an erotic novel, but in the view of some it is a literary drama with elements of eroticism. Like Nabokov's Lolita, Johannes Linnankoski's The Song of the Blood-Red Flower is also often described as erotic novel, only a little explicit and cleverly cloaked in gentler romance.

Lolita and The Story of O were published by Olympia Press, a Paris-based publisher, launched in 1953 by Maurice Girodias as a rebadged version of the Obelisk Press he inherited from his father Jack Kahane. It published a mix of erotic fiction and avant-garde literary works. The Girls of Radcliff Hall is a roman à clef novel in the form of a lesbian girls' school story written in the 1930s by the British composer and bon-vivant Gerald Berners, the 14th Lord Berners, under the pseudonym "Adela Quebec", published and distributed privately in 1932.

Another trend in the twentieth century was the rise of the lesbian pulp fiction. Works such as The Price of Salt (1952), Spring Fire (1952), Desert of the Heart (1964), and Patience and Sarah (1969) were only a few examples of this subgenre. Many of the authors were women themselves, such as Gale Wilhelm and Ann Bannon. Many gay men also enjoyed gay pulp fiction, which borrowed the same sexploitation format as the lesbian books.

Asian erotic fiction

Chinese literature has a rich catalogue of erotic novels that were published during the mid-Ming to early-Qing dynasties. Some well-known erotic novels with explicit sexuality during this period include Ruyijun zhuan (The Lord of Perfect Satisfaction), The Embroidered Couch, Su'e pian, Langshi, Chipozi zhuan, Zhulin yeshi, and The Carnal Prayer Mat.  The critic Charles Stone has argued that pornographic technique is the "union of banality, obscenity, and repetition", and contains just the "rudiments" of plot, style, and characterization, while anything that is not sexually stimulating is avoided. If this is the case, he concluded, then The Lord of Perfect Satisfaction is the "fountainhead of Chinese erotica", but not pornography.  The novel Jin Ping Mei (or The Plum in the Golden Vase), written by an author who used only a pseudonym (as his real name is unknown), is generally regarded as the greatest of all Chinese erotic novels.  Its literary status is unparalleled among erotic fiction and it has been described by critic Stephen Marche in the Los Angeles Review of Books as "one of the world's great novels, if not simply the greatest."

There is also a tradition of erotic fiction in Japan. Some portion of this is doujinshi, or independent comics, which are often fan fiction. The sharebon (洒落本) was a pre-modern Japanese literary genre. Plots revolved around humor and entertainment at the pleasure quarters. It is a subgenre of gesaku.

Contemporary erotic fiction
In the 21st century, a number of female authors, including Alison Tyler, Rachel Kramer Bussel, and Carol Queen, rose to prominence. Mitzi Szereto is an editor and author who said she wants to see the term erotica removed from novels and anthologies that include depictions of sexual activities. Other authors celebrate the term but also question why literature featuring sexual activity should be considered outside literary fiction.

The debate was rekindled in 2012 by the release of the 50 Shades of Grey trilogy written by E. L. James. The success of her erotica for every woman, dubbed 'mommyporn', gave rise to satires like Fifty Shames of Earl Grey by 'Fanny Merkin' (real name Andrew Shaffer), a book of essays called Fifty Writers on Fifty Shades (ed. Lori Perkins) and editors of erotic imprints re-evaluating the content and presentation of the genre.

One development in contemporary erotica is the knowledge that many women, and not just men, are aroused by it. This is regardless of whether it is traditional pornography or tailor-made women's erotica. Romantic novels are sometimes marketed as erotica—or vice versa—as "mainstream" romance in recent decades has begun to exhibit blatant (if poetic) descriptions of sex. Erotic romance is a relatively new genre of romance with an erotic theme and very explicit love scenes, but with a romance at the heart of the story. Erotic fantasy is a subgenre of fantasy fiction and utilizes erotica in a fantasy setting. These stories can essentially cover any of the other subgenres of fantasy, such as high fantasy, contemporary fantasy, or even historical fantasy. The extents of the genre to break existing conventions and limits in subject matter have managed to shock popular audiences, with genres such as monster erotica emerging with the ease of digital publishing.

Erotic fantasy fiction has similarities to romantic fantasy but is more explicit. Erotic fantasy can also be found in fan fiction, which uses plot elements and characters from popular fiction such as television, film, or novels. Erotic fan fiction may use characters from existing works in non-canon relationships, such as slash (homoerotic) fan fiction. Fan fiction and its Japanese counterpart, doujinshi, account for an enormous proportion of all erotica written today.

Internet erotic fiction

The Internet and digital revolution in erotic depiction has changed the forms of representing scenes of a sexual nature. Jennifer Anne Skipp concluded that erotic literature was available among the poor and performed at public readings in 18th-century Britain.

Erotica was present on the Internet from its earliest days, as seen from rec.arts.erotica on Usenet. This news group was a moderated forum for the exchange of erotic stories that predated the creation of the World Wide Web. Most of this migrated to the alt.* hierarchy forums by the 1990s, including alt.sex.stories. The vast majority of Internet erotica is written by amateurs for the enjoyment of the author and readers instead of for profit. The increased interactivity and anonymity allows casual or hobby writers the opportunity not only to author their own stories but also to share them with a world-wide audience. Many authors adopt colorful pseudonyms and can develop cult followings within their genre, although a small number use their real names. Among transgender or non-binary authors, it is a common practice to adopt a feminine or masculine alter-ego, although a writer may use their own given name.

Student erotica

In the 21st century, a new literary genre of student published journals at American universities was started. The following is a partial list of publications:
 The Moderator – Bard College
 Virgin Mawrtyr – Bryn Mawr College
 H-Bomb – Harvard University
 Quake – University of Pennsylvania
 Squirm – Vassar College
 Vita Excolatur – University of Chicago
 Bang and Untouchables – Swarthmore College
 Boink – Boston University

Other accounts

Writings of prostitutes
Prostitution was the focus of much of the earliest erotic works. The term pornography is derived from the Greek pornographos meaning "writer about prostitutes", originally denoting descriptions of the lives and manners of prostitutes and their customers in Ancient Greece. According to Athenaeus in The Deipnosophists these constituted a considerable genre, with many lubricious treatises, stories and dramas on the subject. A surviving example of this genre is Lucian of Samosata's Dialogues of the Courtesans.

Accounts of prostitution have continued as a major part of the genre of erotic literature. In the 18th century, directories of prostitutes and their services, such as Harris's List of Covent Garden Ladies (1757–1795), provided both entertainment and instruction.

In the 19th century, the sensational journalism of W. T. Stead's The Maiden Tribute of Modern Babylon (1885) about the procuring of underage girls into the brothels of Victorian London provided a stimulus for the erotic imagination. Stead's account was widely translated and the revelation of "padded rooms for the purpose of stifling the cries of the tortured victims of lust and brutality" and the symbolic figure of "The Minotaur of London" confirmed European observers worst imaginings about "Le Sadisme anglais" and inspired erotic writers to write of similar scenes set in London or involving sadistic English gentlemen. Such writers include D'Annunzio in Il Piacere, Paul-Jean Toulet in Monsieur de Paur (1898), Octave Mirbeau in Jardin des Supplices (1899) and Jean Lorrain in Monsieur de Phocas (1901).

Well-known recent works in this genre are The Happy Hooker: My Own Story (1971) by the Dutch madame Xaviera Hollander and The Intimate Adventures of a London Call Girl (2005) by Belle de Jour.

Erotic memoirs

Erotic memoirs include Casanova's Histoire de ma vie, from the 18th century. Notable English works of this genre from the 19th century include The Ups and Downs of Life (1867) by Edward Sellon and My Secret Life by "Walter". Edward Sellon was a writer, translator and illustrator of erotic literature who wrote erotica for the pornographic publisher William Dugdale, including such works as The New Epicurean (1865). The true identity of "Walter" is unknown. Ian Gibson, in The Erotomaniac speculates that My Secret Life was actually written by Henry Spencer Ashbee and therefore it is possible that "Walter" is a fiction. 

A famous German erotic work of this time, published in two parts in 1868 and 1875 entitled Pauline the Prima Donna purports to be the memoirs of the opera singer Wilhelmine Schröder-Devrient. Various discrepancies with known facts of the singer's life, however, have led many to doubt the veracity of this book and the erotic adventures contained in the second volume, at least, appear to be implausible. These include the author indulging in lesbian sadomasochism, group sex, sodomy, bestiality, scatology, necrophilia, prostitution, and vampirism all before she had reached the age of 27. 20th-century contributions to the genre include Frank Harris's My Life and Loves (1922–27) and the convicted Austrian sex criminal Edith Cadivec's Confessions and Experiences and its sequel Eros, the Meaning of My Life (published together 1930-1). A 21st-century example is One Hundred Strokes of the Brush Before Bed (2004) by Melissa Panarello.

Sex manuals

Sex manuals are among the oldest forms of erotic literature. Three brief fragments of a sex manual written in the fourth century BC that is attributed to Philaenis of Samos have survived. Modern scholars generally regard it as a work of parody probably written by a man, and this was most likely Athenian sophist Polycrates. Other examples of the genre from the classical world include the lost works of Elephantis and Ovid's Ars Amatoria. The Indian Kama Sutra is one of the world's best-known works of this type. The Ananga Ranga, a 12th-century collection of Indian erotic works, is a lesser known one. The Perfumed Garden for the Soul's Recreation, a 16th-century Arabic work by Sheikh Nefzaoui, is also well-known and is often reprinted and translated. There is anecdotal evidence that, as late as the mid-20th century, sex therapists and other physicians prescribed erotic literature as treatment for erectile dysfunction.

The ancient Chinese versions of the sex manual include the texts that contain the Taoist sexual practices. These include books that show illustrations of the ideal sexual behavior because sex in this religion is not considered taboo but a manifestation of the concept of the yin and yang, wherein the male and female engage in an act of "joining of energy" or "joining of essences".  The belief is that proper sexual practice is key to achieving good health. The manuals included the Ishinpo text, which is a medical document that also included sections devoted to sexual hygiene and sexual manuals of the Tang and Han dynasties.

Chi kung manuals include warming a wet towel and covering penis for a few minutes, then rubbing one direction away from base of penis hundreds of times daily, similar to chi kung. Squeezing sphincter while semi-erect or fully erect dozens of times daily, particularly a few hours before intercourse will help delay orgasm or enhance non-ejaculatory pleasure. The Universal Tao system was developed by Mantak Chia to teach Taoist meditative and exercise techniques to balance the body and increase and refine one's vital energy, or chi ("chee"). Front and back channel, the back channel is where the perineum is located between anus and scrotum moving up the tailbone to the crown, the front channel is moving down the front of your body down the midline. Breathing up the back channel and then breathing out from the front channel down to and from the abdomen moves chi. Many practices combined help chi to be transformed into spiritual energy or shen.

Not all sex manuals were produced to arouse or inform readers about sexual acts. Some were created as a form of satire or social criticism, as in the case of a mock-sex manual produced in the early sixteenth century by Pietro Aretino. It was in response to the clerical censorship of the nude engravings of the Roman artists Marcantonio Raimondi. This was released in cheap wood, with a corresponding sonnet serving as the voice of the characters.

Legal status

Early legislation

To 1857

Erotic or pornographic works have often been prosecuted, censored and destroyed by the authorities on grounds of obscenity. In Medieval England, erotic or pornographic publications were the concern of the ecclesiastical courts. After the Reformation the jurisdiction of these courts declined in favour of the Crown which licensed every printed book. Prosecutions of books for their erotic content alone were rare and works which attacked the church or state gave much more concern to the authorities than erotica or 'obscene libel' as it was then known. For instance the Licensing Act of 1662 was aimed generally at "heretical, seditious, schismatical or offensive books of pamphlets" rather than just erotica per se. Even this Licensing Act was allowed to lapse in 1695 and no attempt made to renew it.

The first conviction for obscenity in England occurred in 1727, when Edmund Curll was fined for the publication of Venus in the Cloister or The Nun in her Smock under the common law offence of disturbing the King's peace. This set a legal precedent for other convictions. The publication of other books by Curll, however, considered seditious and blasphemous, such as The Memoirs of John Ker, apparently most offended the authorities. Prosecutions of erotica later in the 18th century were rare and were most often taken because of the admixture of seditious and blasphemous material with the porn.

1857–1959
 It was the Obscene Publications Act 1857 which made the sale of obscene material a statutory offense, giving the courts power to seize and destroy offending material. The origins of the Act itself were in a trial for the sale of pornography presided over by the Lord Chief Justice, Lord Campbell, at the same time as a debate in the House of Lords over a bill aiming to restrict the sale of poisons. Campbell was taken by the analogy between the two situations, famously referring to the London pornography trade as "a sale of poison more deadly than prussic acid, strychnine or arsenic", and proposed a bill to restrict the sale of pornography; giving statutory powers of destruction would allow for a much more effective degree of prosecution. The bill was controversial at the time, receiving strong opposition from both Houses of Parliament. It was passed on the assurance by the Lord Chief Justice that it was "intended to apply exclusively to works written for the single purpose of corrupting the morals of youth and of a nature calculated to shock the common feelings of decency in any well-regulated mind." The House of Commons successfully amended it so as not to apply to Scotland, on the grounds that Scottish common law was sufficiently stringent.

The Act provided for the seizure and destruction of any material deemed to be obscene, and held for sale or distribution, following information being laid before a "court of summary jurisdiction" (magistrates' court). The Act required that following evidence of a common-law offence being committed – for example, on the report of a plain-clothes policeman who had successfully purchased the material – the court could issue a warrant for the premises to be searched and the material seized. The proprietor then would be called upon to attend court and give reason why the material should not be destroyed. Critically, the Act did not define "obscene", leaving this to the will of the courts.

While the Act itself did not change, the scope of the work affected by it did. In 1868 Sir Alexander Cockburn, Campbell's successor as Lord Chief Justice, held in an appeal that the test of obscenity was "whether the tendency of the matter charged as obscenity is to deprave and corrupt those whose minds are open to such immoral influences and into whose hands a publication of this sort may fall." This was clearly a major change from Campbell's opinion only ten years before – the test now being the effect on someone open to corruption who obtained a copy, not whether the material was intended to corrupt or offend.

Cockburn's declaration remained in force for several decades, and most of the high profile seizures under the Act relied on this interpretation. Known as the Hicklin test no cognisance was taken of the literary merit of a book or on the extent of the offending text within the book in question. The widened scope of the original legislation led to the subsequent notorious targeting of now acknowledged classics of world literature by such authors as Zola, James Joyce and D.H. Lawrence plus medical textbooks by such as Havelock Ellis rather than the blatant erotica which was the original target of this law.

In contrast to England, where actions against obscene literature were the preserve of the magistrates, such actions were the responsibility of the Postal Inspection Service in America. They were embodied in the federal and state Comstock laws and named after the postal officer and anti-obscenity crusader Anthony Comstock, who proved himself officious in the work of suppression both in his official capacity and through his New York Society for the Suppression of Vice.  The first such law was the Comstock Act, (ch. 258  enacted March 3, 1873) which made it illegal to send any "obscene, lewd, and/or lascivious" materials through the mail. Twenty-four states passed similar prohibitions on materials distributed within the states.

Modern legislation

This question of whether a book had literary merit eventually prompted a change in the law in both America and the UK. In the United Kingdom the Obscene Publications Act 1959 provided for the protection of "literature" but conversely increased the penalties against pure "pornography." The law defined obscenity and separated it from serious works of art.

The new definition read:

[A]n article shall be deemed to be obscene if its effect or (where the article comprises two or more distinct items) the effect of any one of its items is, if taken as a whole, such as to tend to deprave and corrupt persons who are likely, having regard to all relevant circumstances, to read, see or hear the matter contained or embodied in it.

After this piece of legislation questions of the literary merit of the work in question were allowed to be put before the judge and jury as in the Lady Chatterley trial. The publishers of the latter book were found not guilty by the court on the grounds of the literary merit of the book. In later prosecutions of literary erotica under the provisions of the act, however, even purely pornographic works with no apparent literary merit escaped destruction by the authorities. Purely textual pornographic texts, with no hint of libel, ceased to be brought to trial following the collapse of the Inside Linda Lovelace trial in 1976.  However, in October 2008, a man was unsuccessfully prosecuted under the Obscene Publications Act (the R v Walker trial) for posting fictional written material to the Internet allegedly describing the kidnap, rape and murder of the pop group Girls Aloud.

The First Amendment to the United States Constitution gives protection to written fiction, although the legal presumption that it does not protect obscene literature has never been overcome. Instead, pornography has successfully been defined legally as non-obscene, or "obscene" been shown to be so vague a term as to be unenforceable. In 1998 Brian Dalton was charged with creation and possession of child pornography under an Ohio obscenity law. The stories were works of fiction concerning sexually abusing children which he wrote and kept, unpublished, in his private journal. He accepted a plea bargain, pleaded guilty and was convicted. Five years later, the conviction was vacated.

Importing books and texts across national borders can sometimes be subject to more stringent laws than in the nations concerned. Customs officers are often permitted to seize even merely 'indecent' works that would be perfectly legal to sell and possess once one is inside the nations concerned. Canada has been implicated in such border seizures.

Although the Obscene Publications Act of 1857, as well as 1959 legislation, outlawed the publication, retail and trafficking of certain types of writings and images regarded as pornographic, and would order the destruction of shop and warehouse stock meant for sale, the private possession of and viewing of pornography was not prosecuted in those times. In some nations, even purely textual erotic literature is still deemed illegal and is also prosecuted.

See also

Notes

References
 Brulotte, Gaëtan & Phillips, John (eds.) (2006) Encyclopedia of Erotic Literature. New York: Routledge
 Gibson, Ian (2001) The Erotomaniac London: Faber & Faber
 H. Montgomery Hyde (1964) A History of Pornography. London: Heinemann
 Kearney, Patrick J. (1982) A History of Erotic Literature, Parragon, 
 Kronhausen, Phyllis & Eberhard (1959) Pornography and the Law, The Psychology of Erotic Realism and Pornography. New York: Ballantine Books
 Kronhausen, Phyllis & Eberhard (1969) Erotic Fantasies, a Study of Sexual Imagination. New York: Grove Press
 Muchembled, Robert (2008) Orgasm and the West: a history of pleasure from the 16th century to the present, Polity, 
 
 Weller, Michael J. The Secret Blue Book. Home Baked Books,, London.
 Williams, Linda (1999) Hardcore: Power, Pleasure, and the 'Frenzy of the Visible'''. Berkeley: University of California Press

Further reading
  With an introduction by G. Legman.
 
 
 
 
 
 
 
  A Bibliography of Works Published by Charles Carrington
 

History

General
 Atkins, John (1970) Sex in Literature, 4 vols. 1970–1982
 Bertolotti, Alessandro. Curiosa la bibliotheque érotique. Paris, Editions La Martiniere, 2012, 
 Di Folco, Philippe, ed. (2005) Dictionnaire de la pornographie. Paris: Presses Universitaires de France, 
 Englisch, Paul (1927) Geschichte der erotischen Literatur, 1927, Reprint 1977, 
 Fischer, Carolin (1997) Gärten der Lust: eine Geschichte erregender Lektüren, Stuttgart; Weimar: Metzler , paperback: München: Dt. Taschenbuch-Verlag, 2000
 Gnüg, Hiltrud (2002) Der erotische Roman: von der Renaissance bis zur Gegenwart, Ditzingen: Reclam 
 Kronhausen, Eberhard & Phyllis (1969) Bücher aus dem Giftschrank: eine Analyse der verbotenen und verfemten erotischen Literatur Pia, Pascal, ed. (1971) Dictionnaire des œuvres érotiques. Paris: Mercure de France
 Schreiber, Hermann (1969) Erotische Texte: sexualpathologische Erscheinungen in der Literatur Spedding, Patrick, curator (2010) Lewd and Scandalous Books: An exhibition of material from the Monash University Library Rare Books Collection, Clayton (Melbourne): Monash University,

 Ancient world and Middle Ages 
 Leick, G. (1994) Sex and Eroticism in Mesopotamian Literature 
 Mulchandani, S. (2006) Erotic Literature of Ancient India: Kama Sutra, Koka Shastra, Gita Govindam, Ananga Ranga 

 Modern times to 1900 
 Goulemot, J. (1993) Gefährliche Bücher: erotische Literatur, Pornographie, Leser und Zensur im 18. Jahrhundert 
 Moulton, I. (2000) Before Pornography: erotic writing in early modern Europe''

External links

 

Literary genres